Poecilopeplus tardifi is a species of beetle in the family Cerambycidae. It was described by Michard in 1887.

References

Trachyderini
Beetles described in 1887